This is a list of properties and districts listed on the National Register of Historic Places in the Northwest quadrant of Washington, D.C. that are both east of Rock Creek and north of M Street.

Current listings

|}

References 

Upper NW
.